Song Ja (born 1936) is a South Korean politician and academic. He has served as chancellor of Yonsei University and Myongji University, and as Minister of Education.

Career
Song was named a professor of business management at Yonsei University in 1977. He was elevated to the position of twelfth chancellor of Yonsei University in August 1992. In November 1994, Yang Dong-kwan of the Seoul Western District Court ruled that his nomination to the chancellorship had been invalid because he formally had not yet applied for restoration of South Korean citizenship at the time, and so was legally stateless. Song had naturalised as a U.S. citizen in 1978, but gave up U.S. citizenship in 1984. However, an appeal court ruled in May 1995 that his lack of citizenship was not sufficient reason to invalidate his nomination. In January 1997, Song announced that he was resigning from his professorship at Yonsei University.

In June 1997, Song was appointed chancellor of Myongji University, also in Seoul. He became Minister of Education in 2000 during the presidency of Kim Dae-jung. He was the third former Myongji University chancellor to receive a cabinet position in the past decade.

Personal life
Song was born in 1936 in Daejeon. His family is part of the Eunjin Song bon-gwan. He graduated from Yonsei University in 1960 and received a scholarship from the U.S. to study at Washington University in St. Louis. He obtained U.S. permanent residence through adjustment of status in 1970. He is married and has two daughters.

References

1936 births
Living people
Eunjin Song clan
Academic staff of Myongji University
People from Daejeon
Former United States citizens
Presidents of universities and colleges in South Korea
South Korean politicians
Washington University in St. Louis alumni
Yonsei University alumni
Academic staff of Yonsei University
Education ministers of South Korea